Matteo Ceccarini (born April 3, 1972 in Milan, Italy) is a DJ, music producer and sound designer.

Early life
In the nineties Matteo began his career as an international deejay  in some trendy clubs of Milan, including La Gare, Shocking Club, Plastic, Hollywood, Armani Privè. He worked in Paris at the Queen Club, La Locomotive and in Bali,Indonesia, where he became resident DJ at the Double Six Club in Legian from 1996 to 1999 and at the Cafè Luna for the White Parties.

Matteo has spent many years of his life in Asia, especially in India, where he has researched traditional sacred music.

Matteo was discovered by the designer Gianfranco Ferré who introduced him to the world of fashion.
In 1993 he began working for some international designers  composing music, DJing and sound designing for their shows.

Career
Since 1992 Matteo has composed and played music as DJ for fashion designers and parties  such as Giorgio Armani, Christian Dior , Vivienne Westwood, Valentino, Gianfranco Ferré, Ferragamo, Donna Karan, Hermes. In 1992 he released his first EP, Politic Dance. This was followed the following year by an EP under the pseudonym of "Lady Kiova" which contained 2 tracks; "Rotation" which was based on the music by Herb Alpert and the track "Macumba Love" was released on "Unknown Label", a sub-label of Klf Music.

In 1997 he worked with Richard Gere composing the music for Richard Gere's pro Tibetan photographic exhibition "Zanskar and Tibet" in Milan.

In 1999 Matteo composed a scandalous soundtrack for the Swish fashion show. Newspaper headlines said "Fashion Shock!" The sound contained a blessing by Pope Karol Wojtyla mixed with an avant-garde performance of the Greek actress Irene Papas simulating an orgasm. Matteo was questioned by the authorities. He explained that the concept was a blessing of procreation and was therefore released. The same year under the pseudonym "Vision" he released an album on the label Edel Music where the song Ponger Star featured on international compilations like Hôtel Costes, Buddha Bar and Nirvana Lounge.

In 2000 his dj set opened the "Frock 'n' Roll" event in Barcelona . The event was attended by Nelson Mandela and U2. In 2003 Matteo played at Mick Jagger's private 60th birthday party.

From 2003 until 2015, he produced the Emporio Armani Caffè and Giorgio Armani Privè compilations.

On 4 September 2004 Ceccarini curated the music for the wedding of John Elkann and Lavinia Borromeo Arese Taverna, at the Isola Madre, Stresa, Italy.

In 2009 Matteo and his partner Eva Riccobono composed and sang "Labbra" ("Lips"), a song recorded in bed. The song was a tribute for the 30th anniversary of "Je t'aime moi non plus" by Serge Gainsbourg.

In 2009 the photographer Paolo Roversi chose to shoot Matteo Ceccarini and Eva Riccobono as part of "L'Uomo Vogue" celebrities feature.

In 2012 Matteo composed the song "Petit Essai" that became the soundtrack of a film for Jaeger Lecoultre  The song is a part of a mini album of piano solos called "Ma richesse c'est ma libertè".
The same year he composed 2 more songs : "The Tube" and "Dimmi tu cos’è" for the soundtrack of the movie "E la chiamano estate" They Call It Summer by Paolo Franchi. The movie went on to win best director and best actress at the Rome International Film Festival .

In 2013 he released the EP Money Maker, with included a cover song by the band The Black Keys, The EP was recorded and mastered at the Abbey Road Studios, London.

2013 was the beginning of his collaboration with the Italian fashion magazine Flair. In his column Matteo interviewed international celebrities using visual stimulus only. 
In the same year his aesthetic sense in photography led him to be chosen to shoot Jacob Cohen's new international campaign, previously shot by the legendary photographer Elliott Erwitt.

In 2014 he founded the "Deriva Collective", a collective of artists who deal with sound research and experimentation  known as sound sculpture. The Deriva Collective is based in London.

In August 2015 Ceccarini curated the music for the wedding of Beatrice Borromeo and Pierre Casiraghi, at the Rocca Borromeo di Angera, Italy.

Matteo Ceccarini has frequently curated the soundtrack for the annual Life Ball in Wien. Each year he collaborated with various international fashion designers, Missoni (2003), Gianfranco Ferré (2004), Calvin Klein, Kenneth Cole, Diane von Fürstenberg (2010), Vogue Italia hosts the 20th Anniversary Life Ball Fashion Show (2012), Roberto Cavalli (2013), Givenchy, Viktor & Rolf, Lanvin, Vivienne Westwood, Etro and DSquared², under the direction of Franca Sozzani (2014), Jean Paul Gaultier (2015).

Since its advent in 2013 every year Ceccarini has curated the entire sound for Vogue Fashion Dubai Experience, including fashion shows, the Dubai Mall soundscape and the party at the Armani Privè Club.

From February 2016, Matteo Ceccarini is the music columnist for GQ magazine.

In February 2016, Matteo Ceccarini released the sound project Ballchestra.

Film scores 
Matteo Ceccarini contributed with two songs to the score of Paolo Franchi's film "E la chiamano Estate" (2012 film) : "The Tube" and " Dimmi tu cos'è" on label Sode Records.

The original soundtrack of Asia Argento's short film for Telecom Italia "Twittastorie" (2013).

The original soundtrack of Alessandra Cardone's film "In love with Shakespeare" (2014).

The original soundtrack One Planet One Future (2016) a movie project by Anne De Carbuccia. 

The soundtrack of Made in Italy tv series (2019).

Personal life
Matteo Ceccarini has a daughter Virginia born in 2001, from his relationship with Floriana Lainati. A son Leo born in London in 2014 and a daughter Livia born in 2020 with Eva Riccobono. In 2004, in Wien during the Life Ball Event, Matteo met the Italian top model Eva Riccobono with whom he lives in London.

Selected discography

Releases
 Politic Dance Vol. 1 (1992) Cadorna Records
 Rotation (1993) Klf Music
 Baje Bodie (1993) Future Rhythm
 Ponger Star (1999) Wagram
 Rites (2000) Edel Music
 Santa Maria (2000) Edel Music
 Beyond (2001) Edel Music
 Gomorra (2002) George V Records
 Until the fucking piano (2002) Wagram
 Silver Cox (2003) Neverstop 
 Shotgun ( 2004) Sony Bmg
 Gate of heaven ( 2004) Ediemme Edizioni Musicali
 Jazz Suite, No. 2, Waltz 2 (2004) Sony Bmg
 Africanism (2004) Sony Bmg
 Labbra "Lips" (2009) SoDe Records
 Blue Ice (2010) SoDe Records
 Strong String (2011) SoDe Records
 Emporio Armani Caffe' Vol. 1 (2003) Neverstop Music
 Emporio Armani Caffe' Vol. 2 (2004) Sony Bmg
 Emporio Armani Caffe' Vol. 3 (2006) SoDe Records
 Emporio Armani Caffe' Vol. 4 (2008) SoDe Records
 Emporio Armani Caffe' Vol. 5 (2009) SoDe Records
 Emporio Armani Caffe' Vol. 6 (2011) SoDe Records
 Emporio Armani Caffe' Vol. 7 (2012) SoDe Records- Giorgio Armani
 Emporio Armani Caffe' Vol. 8 (2015) Deriva Collective Records - Giorgio Armani
 Emporio Armani Caffe' Vol. 9 (2017) Deriva Collective Records - Giorgio Armani
 Emporio Armani Caffe' Vol. X (2018) Deriva Collective Records - Giorgio Armani
 Amigdala (2012) SoDe Records
 Petit Essai (2012) SoDe Records
 Money Maker (2013) SoDe Records
 The Tube (2013) SoDe Records
 Beijing Blues (2013) SoDe Records
 Light me (2013) SoDe Records
 Giorgio Armani Privè (2014) Deriva Collective Records-Giorgio Armani
 Matteo Ceccarini for Oxfam (2015) Deriva Collective Records 
 Ballchestra (2016) Deriva Collective Records
 One Planet One Future (2016) (Original Soundtrack) Deriva Collective Records 
 Geometric Physical (2018) Deriva Collective Records 
 Ode (2019) Deriva Collective Records 
 Private Ouverture (2019) Deriva Collective Records 
 Medusa (2020) Deriva Collective Records

Awards
In 2013, he produced in association with Ginevra Elkann, Ryan Gosling, Babak Jalali, Eva Riccobono the movie White Shadow by the director Noaz Deshe, who went on to win the Gold Lion of the Future at the 70° Venice International Film Festival. In 2018 he won the best music for fashion Chi e' Chi Award.

References

External links

1972 births
Sound designers
Living people